Lysyl oxidase homolog 2 is an enzyme that in humans is encoded by the LOXL2 gene.

Function 
This gene encodes a member of the lysyl oxidase gene family. The prototypic member of the family is essential to the biogenesis of connective tissue, encoding an extracellular copper-dependent amine oxidase that catalyses the first step in the formation of crosslinks in collagens and elastin. A highly conserved amino acid sequence at the C-terminus end appears to be sufficient for amine oxidase activity, suggesting that each family member may retain this function. The N-terminus is poorly conserved and may impart additional roles in developmental regulation, senescence, tumor suppression, cell growth control, and chemotaxis to each member of the family.

LOXL2 can also crosslink collagen type IV and hence influence the sprouting of new blood vessels.

Clinical significance 
LOXL2 is an enzyme that is up-regulated in several types of cancer and is associated with a poorer prognosis. LOXL2 changes the structure of histones (proteins that are attached to DNA) and thus changes the shape of the cells, making it easier for the cancer cells to metastasize.

An antibody that inhibits the activity of LOXL2, simtuzumab and is currently in clinical trials for the treatment of several types of cancer and fibrotic diseases such as liver fibrosis.

See also 
 LOXL1
 LOXL3
 LOXL4

References

External links

Further reading 

 
 
 
 
 
 
 
 
 
 
 
 

Lysyl oxidases